Sven Patrik Lövgren (born 12 October 1975 in Malmö) is a retired Swedish athlete who specialised in sprinting events. He enjoyed most success in the indoor 60 metres, making the final at several major championships. With 6.58, he is the joint Swedish record holder in that event, together with Peter Karlsson.

Sven Patrik Lövgren is the son of the successful athletes Sven-Åke Lövgren and Margareta Lövgren.

Competition record

Personal bests
Outdoors
100 meters – 10.26 (+1.4 m/s) (Jönköping 2002)
200 meters – 21.15 (+1.0 m/s) (Halmstad 1999)

Indoors
60 meters – 6.58 (Paris 1997) NR

References

1975 births
Living people
Swedish male sprinters
Sportspeople from Malmö
20th-century Swedish people